Bloodied / Unbowed is the fourth studio album by American metalcore band Oh, Sleeper, and their first full-length album since Children of Fire (2011). Originally announced for release in mid-2017, it was eventually released on July 12, 2019, through Solid State Records after the 2013 independent release of The Titan EP.

Track listing

Personnel
Micah Kinard - lead vocals
Shane Blay - guitars, bass, clean vocals
Zac Mayfield - drums

References

External links 
[ Billboard.com]

2019 albums
Oh, Sleeper albums